Muhammad Qasim Nanautavi (1832 – 15 April 1880) was an Indian Sunni Hanafi Maturidi Islamic Scholar, theologian and a Sufi who was one of the main founders of the Deobandi Movement, starting from the Darul Uloom Deoband.

Name and lineage

His ism (given name) was Muhammad Qasim. His nasab (patronymic) is: Muhammad Qāsim ibn Asad Ali ibn Ghulam Shāh ibn Muhammad Bakhsh ibn Alāuddīn ibn Muhammad Fateh ibn Muhammad Mufti ibn Abd al-Samī ibn Muhammad Hāshim

The "nasab" meets Qasim ibn Muhammad ibn Abi Bakr after 44 links.

Early life and education
Nanautawi was born in 1832 (either in Sha'ban or Ramadan, 1248 AH) into the Siddiqi family of Nanauta, a town near Saharanpur, India.

Nanautawi was schooled at Nanauta, where he memorized the Quran and learned calligraphy. Aged nine, Nanautawi moved to Deoband where he studied at the madrasa of Karamat Hussain. The teacher at this "madrasa" was Mehtab Ali, the uncle of Mahmud Hasan Deobandi. Under the instruction of Mehtab Ali, Nanautawi completed the primary books of Arabic grammar and syntax.Thereafter, his mother sent him to Saharanpur, where his maternal grandfather Wajīhuddīn Wakīl, who was a poet of Urdu and Persian, lived. Wakīl enrolled his grandson in the Persian class of Muḥammad Nawāz Sahāranpūri, under whom, Nanautawi, then aged twelve, completed Persian studies.

In 1844, Nanautawi joined the Delhi College, where he studied with Mamluk Ali Nanautawi. According to Asir Adrawi, "Nanautawi although was enrolled in the college, he would take private classes at his teachers home, instead of the college". He studied the major books with Mamluk Ali, including "mantiq" and philosophy, and few other books with Mufti Sadruddīn. According to Ashraf Ali Thanwi, "Mamluk Ali, the teacher of Rashid Ahmad Gangohi and Nanautawi was a government employee at Dār al-Baqā", in Delhi, which suggests that Nanautawi possibly studied there. Manazir Ahsan Gilani has tried to reconcile the reports concerning Nanautawi's education at the college. He says that, the name of Nanautawi appeared in the official registry of the college in the first year and argues, "whatsoever it is, but it is not right that he gained education there, since the starting". Nanautawi stayed in Delhi for around five or six years, and graduated, aged seventeen. Gīlāni says that, Nanautawi studied with Mamluk Ali Nanautawi, but not the syllabus of the college, rather studied at his home. It is commonly accepted that Nanautawi did not appear in the college exams.

Career

Academic career 

After the completion of his education, Nanautavi became the editor of the press at Matbah-e-Ahmadi. During this period, at Ahmad Ali's insistence, he wrote a scholium on the last few portions of Sahihul Bukhari. Before the establishment of Darul Uloom Deoband, he taught Euclid for some time at the Chhatta Masjid. His lectures were delivered at the printing press. His teaching produced a group of accomplished Ulama, the example of which had not been seen since Shah Abdul Ghani's time.

In 1860, he performed Hajj and, on his return, he accepted a profession of collating books at Matbah-e-Mujtaba in Meerut. Nanautavi remained attached to this press until 1868. He performed Hajj for the second time and then accepted a job at Matbah-e-Hashimi in Meerut.

Polemical debates 

On 8 May 1876, a "Fair for God-Consciousness" was held at Chandapur village, near Shahjahanpur (U. P.), under the auspices of the local Zamindar, Piyare Lal Kabir-panthi and Padre Knowles, and with the support and permission of the collector of Shahjahanpur, Robert George. Christians, Hindus, and Muslims were invited through posters to attend and prove the truthfulness of their respective religions. At the suggestion of Muhammad Munir Nanautavi and Maulvi Ilahi Bakhsh Rangin Bareillwi, Nanautavi, accompanied by numerous colleagues, also participated. All of these Ulama delivered speeches at the fair. Nanautavi repudiated the Doctrine of the Trinity, speaking in support of the Islamic conception of God. One newspaper wrote:In the gathering of 8 May of the current year (1876), Muhammad Qasim gave a lecture and stated the merits of Islam. The Padre Sahib explained the Trinity in a strange manner, saying that in a line are found three attributes: length, breadth and depth, and thus Trinity is proven in every way. The said Maulawi Sahib confuted it promptly. Then, while the Padre Sahib and the Maulawi Sahib were debating regarding the speech, the meeting broke up, and in the vicinity and on all sides arose the outcry that the Muslims had won. Wherever a religious divine of Islam stood, thousands of men would gather around him. In the meeting of the first day, the Christians did not reply to the objections raised by the followers of Islam, while the Muslims replied the Christians word by word and won.

Political and revolutionary activities 
He participated in the Indian Rebellion of 1857 in the Battle of Shamli between the British and the anti-colonialist ulema. The scholars were ultimately defeated at that battle.

Establishment of Islamic schools

He established Darul Uloom Deoband in 1866 with the financial help and funding of the Muslim states within India and the rich individuals of the Muslim Indian community.

He conformed to the Shari'a and worked to motivate other people to do so. It was through his work that a prominent madrasa was established in Deoband and a mosque was built in 1868. Through his efforts, Islamic schools were established at various other locations as well.

His greatest achievement was the revival of an educational movement for the renaissance of religious sciences in India and the creation of guiding principles for the madaris (schools). Under his attention and supervision, madaris were established in areas such as Thanabhavan, Galautti, Kerana, Danapur, Meerut, and Muradabad. Most of them still exist, rendering educational and religious services in their vicinity. Funding of these religious schools initially was done by the rulers of the Muslim states and the rich individuals of the Muslim Indian community.

Under Muhammad Qasim Nanautvi's guidance, these religious schools, at least in the beginning, remained distant from politics and devoted their services to providing only religious education to Muslim children. The curriculum at these schools was studying the Quran, Hadith, Islamic law, and logic.

Jamia Qasmia Madrasa Shahi was established under his supervision.

Death and legacy
Nanautavi died on 15 April 1880 at the age of 47. His grave is to the north of the Darul-Uloom. Since Qasim Nanautavi is buried there, the place is known as Qabrastan-e-Qasimi, where countless Deobandi scholars, students, and others are buried. 
Well-known Muslim educationist of that time Syed Ahmad Khan had great respect for Nanautavi and wrote an emotional and long article on his death.

He has been given the title of Hujjat al-Islam by his followers.

Family
Nanautavi's son Hafiz Muhammad Ahmad was a Grand Mufti of Hyderabad State from 1922 to 1925 and served as the Vice Chancellor of Deoband seminary for thirty five years.

Nanautawi's grandson Muhammad Tayyib Qasmi served as the Vice Chancellor of Deoband seminary for more than five decades and co-founded the All India Muslim Personal Law Board, while Tayyib's son Muhammad Salim Qasmi founded the Darul Uloom Waqf seminary. Salim's son Muhammad Sufyan Qasmi is the rector of Darul Uloom Waqf.

Publications 
 Aab-i Hayat (commentary on the life of the prophet Muhammad
 Tahzir al-Nas
 Mubahisah Shahjahanpur
 Tasfiyat al-Aqa'id
 Tauseeq-ul-Kalam
 Sadaqat-i- Islam

Notes

See also
Muhammad Mian Mansoor Ansari

Bibliography
 
 
 
 
 
 
 
مولانا محمد قاسم نا نوتوی کی دينی و علمی خدمات کا تحقيقی مطالعہ

References

1832 births
1880 deaths
Indian independence activists from Uttar Pradesh
People from Saharanpur district
Indian Sunni Muslim scholars of Islam
Deobandis
Founders of Indian schools and colleges
Hanafis
Maturidis
Mujaddid
People from Nanauta
Qasmi family
Burials at Mazar-e-Qasmi